Heathrow Central bus station is a large bus station that serves terminals 2 and 3 of Heathrow Airport, in London, England. It provides urban bus and long-distance coach services to destinations in London and to regional destinations across Britain. It is the UK's busiest bus and coach station with over 1,600 services each day to over 1,000 destinations. An estimated 13% of air passengers using Heathrow Airport use bus and coach services from Heathrow Central bus station.

Services

Abellio London, London General, London United, London Sovereign, Metrobus and Metroline, operate local bus services from stands 18 and 19 on behalf of Transport for London from Heathrow Central as far as Uxbridge, Ruislip, Harrow, Greenford, Hounslow, Kingston and Croydon. A night bus operates into Central London.

First Berkshire, Arriva Shires & Essex, Carousel Buses and Diamond South East operate bus services from stand 20 to destinations including Maidenhead, Slough, High Wycombe, Whitley Village, Watford, St Albans and Harlow.

Long-distance coach services by National Express, Megabus, First Berkshire (RailAir), The Airline, and Flixbus operate from stands 6 to 17 connecting with other airports, main towns and cities across the United Kingdom.

Transport interchange
Heathrow Central bus station is situated directly above Heathrow Terminals 2 & 3 tube station on the Piccadilly line of London Underground linked by escalators and lifts. It is also linked by underground walkways to Heathrow Central railway station, which is served by the Elizabeth line and Heathrow Express. Both these stations provide direct rail links with Central London.

Access to terminals
Heathrow Central bus station is open 24 hours a day and it is connected to Terminals 2 and 3 via underground walkways.

Air passengers travelling through Terminals 4 and 5 can use the rail and Heathrow Express services free of charge within the Heathrow free travel zone to reach Heathrow Central stations and change to the bus station. A travel centre at the central bus station provides travel information.

The free travel zone was suspended in January 2021 due to financial losses due to the COVID-19 pandemic.

Passengers using Central Bus station but not connecting via flights from the airport are directed to use drop off/pick up points at the adjacent Terminal 2.

References

External links

 Buses from Heathrow Central Bus Station - Transport for London 
 Heathrow Central Bus and Coach Station Milesfaster
  

Buildings and structures at Heathrow Airport
Bus stations in London
Buses serving Heathrow Airport
Transport in the London Borough of Hillingdon
Central bus station